Asclepias amplexicaulis, the blunt-leaved milkweed, clasping milkweed, or sand milkweed, is a species of flowering plant in the subfamily Asclepiadoideae (Apocynaceae). It is endemic to the United States, where it is mostly found east of the Great Plains. It grows in dry prairies, savannas, open woods, and fallow fields, usually in sandy soil.

Description

This plant was eaten as food historically. However, it contains a poison dangerous to humans and livestock, so caution must be used if ingesting this plant.

References

External links 
 

amplexicaulis
Flora of North America